Ornithomya cecropis  is a biting fly in the family of louse flies, Hippoboscidae. It was first isolated from the Mascarene martin, Phedina borbonica, in Madagascar.

References

Parasites of birds
Hippoboscidae
Insects described in 1971